Afade (Afaɗə) is an Afro-Asiatic language spoken in eastern Nigeria and northwestern Cameroon.

Classification 
Afade is a member of the Biu-Mandara group of the Afro-Asiatic family of languages. It is related to the Cameroonian languages Mpade, Maslam, Malgbe, Mser, and Lagwan.

Geographic distribution

Ethnologue
The speakers of Afade are the indigenous Kotoko people of Cameroon and Nigeria. According to Ethnologue, in Cameroon, it is spoken in the far North region: Logone-and-Chari division, south Makari subdivision, Afade area. The language is spoken by 6,700 Cameroon speakers. In Nigeria, Afade is spoken by 40,000 speakers in Borno State, Ngala LGA, 12 villages. There are no known dialects.

ALCAM (2012)
In Cameroon, Afade is spoken in the southern part of Makari commune, centered on the town of Afade and extending into Logone-Birni (Logone-et-Chari department, Far North region). It is spoken mainly in Nigeria.

Phonology

Afade has a large inventory of consonants, including ejectives, implosives, and labial-velar stops. The vowels of Afade are /i u e ɤ o ɛ ɔ a ɑ/. /a/ is front, rather than central.

Notes

References 
 P. Bouny.  1977.  "Inventaire phonetique d'un parler Kotoko:  le Mandagué de Mara," Etudes Phonologiques Tschadiennes.  Ed. Jean-Pierre Caprile.  Paris:  SELAF.  Pages 59–77.

Biu-Mandara languages
Languages of Nigeria
Languages of Cameroon